Dolores Hansen (born October 16, 1946) is a judge at the Administrative Tribunal of the International Labour Organization and a former judge of the Federal Court of Canada.

References

1946 births
Living people
Judges of the Federal Court of Canada
Canadian women judges
Judges of the Administrative Tribunal of the International Labour Organization
People from Edmonton